In mathematics, base change lifting is a method of constructing new automorphic forms from old ones, that corresponds in Langlands philosophy to the operation of restricting a representation of a Galois group to a subgroup. 

The Doi–Naganuma lifting from 1967 was a precursor of the base change lifting.

,  and  gave expositions of the base change lifting for GL2 and its applications to the Artin conjecture.

Properties

If E/F is a finite cyclic Galois extension of global fields, then the base change lifting of  gives a map from automorphic forms for GLn(F) to automorphic forms for GLn(E) = ResE/FGLn(F). This base change lifting is the special case of Langlands functoriality, corresponding (roughly) to the diagonal embedding of the Langlands dual GLn(C) of GLn to the Langlands dual GLn(C)×...×GLn(C) of ResE/FGLn.

References

Langlands program